The eastern willow miner bee (Andrena bisalicis) is a species of miner bee in the family Andrenidae. It is found in North America.

References

Further reading

External links

 

bisalicis
Articles created by Qbugbot
Insects described in 1908